Visa requirements for Czech citizens are administrative entry restrictions by the authorities of other states placed on citizens of the Czech Republic.

As of 10 January 2023, Czech citizens had visa-free or visa on arrival access to 186 countries and territories, ranking the Czech passport 7th overall (tied with the passports of Belgium, New Zealand, Norway, Switzerland, and the United States), and tied as highest of all the European Union member states that have joined the EU since 1 May 2004, in terms of travel freedom according to the Henley Passport Index.

Historical perspective
Visa requirements for Czech citizens were lifted by Belarus in February 2017, the Solomon Islands in October 2016, Tuvalu in July 2016, the Marshall Islands in June 2016, Palau (December 2015), Tonga (November 2015), São Tomé and Príncipe (August 2015), Indonesia (June 2015), United Arab Emirates, Timor-Leste, Samoa (May 2015), Cape Verde (1 January 2019) and Uzbekistan (1 February 2019).

Czech citizens were made eligible for eVisas recently by Saudi Arabia (September 2019), Suriname and Pakistan (April 2019), Tanzania and Papua New Guinea (November 2018), Angola (March 2018), Djibouti (February 2018), Egypt (December 2017), Azerbaijan (January 2017), Tajikistan (June 2016), India (e-Tourist visa from February 2016) and Myanmar (September 2014).

In 2014, Czech Republic ranked 10th on the list of countries based on the visa requirements for their citizens. This means that Czech citizens could travel to 162 countries and territories visa-free or can obtain visa on arrival. In 2009 Czech citizens could travel to 131 countries without a visa, to 142 in 2010, 152 in 2012, 167 in 2016, 168 in 2017, 182 in 2018, 181 in 2019, and 183 in 2020.

Visa requirements map

Visa requirements

Territories and disputed areas
Visa requirements for Czech citizens for visits to various territories, disputed areas, partially recognized countries and restricted zones:

Europe
 — Visa required.
 — Visa required (issued for single entry for 21 days/1/2/3 months or multiple entry visa for 1/2/3 months).Travellers who visited Artsakh or other occupied areas without prior Azerbaijani authorisation will be denied entry to Azerbaijan. Azerbaijani government keeps and publishes list of foreign nationals who visited these occupied areas without prior approval. As of late 2017 the list contains 699 persons including 12 Czech citizens.
 Mount Athos — Special permit required (4 days: 25 euro for Orthodox visitors, 35 euro for non-Orthodox visitors, 18 euro for students). There is a visitors' quota: maximum 100 Orthodox and 10 non-Orthodox per day and women are not allowed.
 Brest and Grodno — Visa not required for 10 days.
 Crimea — Visa issued by Russia is required.
 — Visa free access for 3 months. Passport required.
 UN Buffer Zone in Cyprus — Access Permit is required for travelling inside the zone, except Civil Use Areas.
 — Visa not required.
 — Visa not required, ID card valid.
 – Visa not required.
  – Visa not required.
  – Visa not required.
 — Visa not required.
 Jan Mayen — Permit issued by the local police required for staying for less than 24 hours and permit issued by the Norwegian police for staying for more than 24 hours.
 – Visa not required.
 — Visa free for 90 days, biometric ID card valid.
 Closed cities and regions in Russia — special authorization required.
 — Visa free. Multiple entry visa to Russia and three-day prior notification are required to enter South Ossetia.
 — Visa free. Registration required after 24h.; 45 days, possibly ID card valid

Africa
  (outside Asmara) — visa covers Asmara only; to travel in the rest of the country, a Travel Permit for Foreigners is required (20 Eritrean nakfa).
 (Western Sahara controlled territory) — Visa not required up to 3 months.
 — Visa required (1 months for 40 US dollars, payable on arrival).
 — All foreigners traveling more than 25 kilometers outside of Khartoum must obtain a travel permit.
 Darfur — Separate travel permit is required.
 — Certain countries will deny access to holders of Israeli visas or passport stamps of Israel because of the Arab League boycott of Israel.

Asia
 — Visa not required for 90 days.
 — Protected Area Permit (PAP) required for whole states of Nagaland and Sikkim and parts of states Mizoram, Manipur, Arunachal Pradesh, Uttaranchal, Jammu and Kashmir, Rajasthan, Himachal Pradesh. Restricted Area Permit (RAP) required for all of Andaman and Nicobar Islands and parts of Sikkim. Some of these requirements are occasionally lifted for a year.
 — Visa on arrival for 15 days is available at Erbil and Sulaymaniyah airports.
 — Special permission required for the town of Baikonur and surrounding areas in Kyzylorda Oblast, and the town of Gvardeyskiy near Almaty.
 — Visa not required for 90 days.
 Sabah and Sarawak — These states have their own immigration authorities and passport is required to travel to them, however the same visa applies.
 outside Pyongyang – People are not allowed to leave the capital city, tourists can only leave the capital with a governmental tourist guide (no independent moving)
 — Visa not required. Arrival by sea to Gaza Strip not allowed.
 — Visa not required for 90 days.
 Gorno-Badakhshan Autonomous Province — OVIR permit required (15+5 Tajikistani Somoni) and another special permit (free of charge) is required for Lake Sarez.
 — A special permit, issued prior to arrival by Ministry of Foreign Affairs, is required if visiting the following places: Atamurat, Cheleken, Dashoguz, Serakhs and Serhetabat.
 Tibet Autonomous Region — Tibet Travel Permit required (10 US Dollars).
 Korean Demilitarized Zone — restricted zone.
 UNDOF Zone and Ghajar — restricted zones.
 Phú Quốc — can visit without a visa for up to 30 days.
 — Certain countries will deny access to holders of Israeli visas or passport stamps of Israel because of the Arab League boycott of Israel.

Caribbean and North Atlantic
 — Visa not required for 3 months.
 — Visa not required for 90 days.
 Bonaire, St. Eustatius and Saba — Visa not required for 3 months.
 — Visa not required for 6 months (extendable).
 — Visa not required for 6 months.
 — Visa not required for 60 days.
 — Visitors arriving at San Andrés must buy tourist cards on arrival.
 — Visa not required for 3 months.
 — Visa not required for 6 months.
 — Visa not required.
 Margarita Island — All visitors are fingerprinted.
 — Visa not required under the Visa Waiver Program, for 90 days on arrival from overseas for 2 years. ESTA required.
 — Visa not required.
 — Visa not required.
 — Visa not required.
 — Visa not required for 3 months.
 — Visa not required for 90 days.
 — Visa not required under the Visa Waiver Program, for 90 days on arrival from overseas for 2 years. ESTA required.

Oceania
 — Electronic authorization for 30 days.
 Ashmore and Cartier Islands — special authorisation required.
 Clipperton Island — special permit required.
 — Visa free access for 31 days.
 Lau Province — Special permission required. If you are traveling to the Lau group of islands by yacht, you need special permission from your first port of entry into Fiji.
 — Visa not required.
 — Visa not required under the Visa Waiver Program, for 90 days on arrival from overseas for 2 years. ESTA required.
 — Visa not required for 3 months.
 — Visa on arrival valid for 30 days is issued free of charge.
  — Visa not required under the Visa Waiver Program, for 90 days on arrival from overseas for 2 years. ESTA required.
 — 14 days visa free and landing fee US$35 or tax of US$5 if not going ashore.
 — Visa required (entry permit).
 United States Minor Outlying Islands — special permits required for Baker Island, Howland Island, Jarvis Island, Johnston Atoll, Kingman Reef, Midway Atoll, Palmyra Atoll and Wake Island.
 — Visa not required.

South America
 Galápagos — Online pre-registration is required. Transit Control Card must also be obtained at the airport prior to departure.

South Atlantic and Antarctica
 — Visitor Permit valid for 4 weeks is issued on arrival.

 — eVisa for 3 months within any year period.
 — Entry Permit (£25) for 183 days is issued on arrival.
 — Permission to land required for 15/30 pounds sterling (yacht/ship passenger) for Tristan da Cunha Island or 20 pounds sterling for Gough Island, Inaccessible Island or Nightingale Islands.
 — Pre-arrival permit from the Commissioner required (72 hours/1 month for 110/160 pounds sterling).

Right to consular protection in non-EU countries

When in a non-EU country where there is no Czech embassy, Czech citizens as EU citizens have the right to get consular protection from the embassy of any other EU country present in that country.

See also List of diplomatic missions of the Czech Republic.

Non-visa restrictions

See also

Visa requirements for European Union citizens
Czech passport

References and Notes
References

Notes

Czech Republic
Foreign relations of the Czech Republic